The 1926 Pottsville Maroons season was their second in the National Football League. The team matched their previous league record of 10–2, They finished third in the league standings.

The Maroons established an NFL record for most shutout wins or ties in a season, with 11 in "official" league games.

Schedule

Standings

References

1926
Pottsville Maroons
Boston